John Bernard Walsh (20 August 1909 – 23 June 1998) was an Irish Gaelic footballer. His championship career with the Kerry senior team spanned thirteen seasons from 1932 until 1944.

Career
Walsh first played competitive football for the Ballylongford club. He won a number of North Kerry senior championship medals with the club towards the end of his career. As a member of the Shannon Rangers divisional team Walsh won two county senior championship medals.

Walsh made his inter-county debut during the 1932 championship. Over the course of the next thirteen seasons he won five All-Ireland medals, beginning with wins in 1932 and 1937 before winning three successive championships from 1939 to 1941. Walsh also won ten Munster medals. He played his last game for Kerry in September 1944.

After being selected for the Munster inter-provincial team for the first time in 1941, Walsh was a regular for three successive seasons. During that time he won one Railway Cup medal.

Honours

Shannon Rangers
Kerry Senior Football Championship (2): 1942, 1945

Kerry
All-Ireland Senior Football Championship (5): 1932, 1937, 1939, 1940, 1941
Munster Senior Football Championship (10): 1932, 1933, 1934, 1937, 1938, 1939, 1940, 1941, 1942, 1944

Munster
Railway Cup (1): 1941

References

1909 births
1998 deaths
Ballylongford Gaelic footballers
Shannon Rangers Gaelic footballers
Kerry inter-county Gaelic footballers
Munster inter-provincial Gaelic footballers